Ovid is a statutory town in Sedgwick County, Colorado, United States. The population was 318 at the 2010 census.

History
The town was named after Newton Ovid, a local resident.

Geography
Ovid is located at  (40.959919, -102.388851).

Demographics

As of the census of 2000, there were 330 people, 151 households, and 101 families residing in the town. The racial makeup of the town was 87.27% White, 1.82% African American, 0.91% Native American, 0.91% Asian, 7.58% from other races, and 1.52% from two or more races. Hispanic or Latino of any race were 18.79% of the population.

There were 151 households, out of which 19.9% had children under the age of 18 living with them, 55.6% were married couples living together, 10.6% had a female householder with no husband present, and 32.5% were non-families. 32.5% of all households were made up of individuals, and 17.2% had someone living alone who was 65 years of age or older. The average household size was 2.19 and the average family size was 2.73.

In the town, the population was spread out, with 19.7% under the age of 18, 5.2% from 18 to 24, 23.3% from 25 to 44, 27.0% from 45 to 64, and 24.8% who were 65 years of age or older. The median age was 46 years. For every 100 females, there were 102.5 males. For every 100 females age 18 and over, there were 93.4 males.

The median income for a household in the town was $24,205, and the median income for a family was $30,000. Males had a median income of $25,417 versus $16,042 for females. The per capita income for the town was $13,240. About 8.9% of families and 10.2% of the population were below the poverty line, including 16.1% of those under age 18 and 8.0% of those age 65 or over.

See also

Outline of Colorado
Index of Colorado-related articles
State of Colorado
Colorado cities and towns
Colorado municipalities
Colorado counties
Sedgwick County, Colorado

References

External links
Town of Ovid
CDOT map of the Town of Ovid

Towns in Sedgwick County, Colorado
Towns in Colorado